The Glowworm Tunnel is a disused railway tunnel between Lithgow, New South Wales and Newnes, New South Wales, Australia. It is notable for its resident glow-worms, the bioluminescent larvae of Arachnocampa richardsae, a type of fungus gnat.

Description and history
The  tunnel was bored through the sandstone in 1907 as part of the Newnes railway line that served the Newnes oil shale mines that operated during the early 20th century. The railway was closed in 1932 and the rails were pulled out of the tunnel.

The tunnel is now contained within the Wollemi National Park and is a popular attraction for bushwalkers and tourists. Outside the tunnel, the area features spectacular gorges, caves and scenery. The site is maintained by the National Parks and Wildlife Service. On the south side of the tunnel, a large gap in the road prevents vehicular access. According to some sources, this gap was created deliberately to keep cars out of the tunnel, because the exhaust fumes would have killed the glow-worms. On the north side of the tunnel, a track leads to Newnes.

Access
Access to the tunnel is via several routes:
 11 km walk each way: Walk along the route of the old railway line from Newnes
 9 km return walk: Drive to the weir over the Wolgan River 7 km before Newnes. Walk up the nearby fire trail to the railway line to the right
 Walk or cycle in from Newnes State forest
 Drive from Lithgow or Clarence (both roads eventually join up), about 25 km along good unsealed road, and walk 1 km to the tunnel. (note: drive through first tunnel and park at the end of Glowworm Tunnel Road).

See also 
 Rail trail

References

Further reading
Newnes Line - NSWrail.net

External links

 Newnes Services
 Info Blue Mountains
 Track notes for access via Pagoda Track (2 km or 6 km return) and Newnes (9 km return)

Railway tunnels in New South Wales
Rail trails in Australia
Disused tunnels in Australia